Geoffrey of Hauteville (also Gottfried, Godfrey, Godefroi, Goffredo, or Gaufrido; about 1020-1071) was a Norman military leader, the second youngest son of Tancred of Hauteville by his first wife Muriella.  He joined his brothers in the Mezzogiorno around 1053, arriving with his half-brothers Mauger and William.  He was certainly present at the Battle of Civitate in that year.

In that year, Humphrey, his brother the count of Apulia, gave Mauger and William the Capitanate and the Principate, respectively, with the title of count.  When Mauger died later that decade (in 1054, according to Goffredo Malaterra), the county passed to William, who gave it to Geoffrey. In 1059, his brother Robert Guiscard, Humphrey's successor over Geoffrey, who was older, but had not been in the south as long, helped him quell a revolt in the Capitanate.  He also ruled the region around Loritello, where his son Robert was invested as count, and he expanded his domains into those of the pope, conquering Gissi in the Abruzzi.  His death is a matter of confusion.  The Breve Chronicon Northmannicum states, on the authority of Goffredo Malaterra, that he died in 1063, but the chronicler apparently confused the many Geoffreys of the period.  He probably died circa 1071.

He had been married in Normandy and he had three sons from that union: the aforementioned Robert; Ralph, who inherited Catanzaro; and William, who inherited Tiriolo.  In the Mezzogiorno, he married, like his eldest brother William Iron Arm, a niece of the Prince Guaimar IV of Salerno, Theodora of Capaccio, daughter of Pandulf, lord of Capaccio, Guaimar's brother. From this second marriage was born at least one son, named Tancred, who was alive in 1103 and 1104. He also had a son, of unknown parentage, named Drogo or Tasso .

Sources
Chalandon, Ferdinand. Histoire de la domination normande en Italie et en Sicile. Paris, 1907.
Norwich, John Julius. The Normans in the South 1016-1130. Longmans: London, 1967.

1071 deaths
Italo-Normans
Norman warriors
Year of birth unknown
Geoffrey
Year of birth uncertain